The lottery of birth is a philosophical argument which states that since no one chooses the circumstances into which they are born, people should not be held responsible for them (being rich, being poor and so on).

The lottery of birth argument has been used by philosophers such as John Locke, Thomas Hobbes and Jean-Jacques Rousseau, but more modern day uses have been prompted by political theorists such as John Rawls, who explores the subject in depth in his book A Theory of Justice.

See also 
 Nepotism
 Spoon class theory
 Survivorship bias

References 

Philosophical arguments